Thai Tap Water Supply Public Company Limited (TTW) is tap water producer and distributor in Nakhon Pathom and Samut Sakorn areas for the Provincial Waterworks Authority (PWA), to replace tap water production from the PWA's groundwater wells and to increase tap water production volume to accommodate consumers demand so as to help alleviate land subsidence problems and saltwater penetration in accordance with the governmental policy. Pathum Thani Water Co., Ltd. (PTW), the company's subsidiary, is engaged in the same business in Pathum Thani Province.

History
Thai Tap Water Supply was founded on 11 September 2000 with an initial registered capital of 100,000 baht. At the present the company has the registered capital of 3.99 billion baht.

On 22 May 2008, TTW was listed on the Stock Exchange of Thailand.

References

Thai companies established in 2000
Companies listed on the Stock Exchange of Thailand
Water companies of Thailand